Glenea sarasinorum is a species of beetle in the family Cerambycidae. It was described by Heller in 1896. It is known from Sulawesi.

References

sarasinorum
Beetles described in 1896